Guadalupe is an unincorporated community in Conejos County, in the U.S. state of Colorado.

The community, which is centered on a grassy plaza, is located on the north bank of the Conejos River, just north of Conejos, Colorado, along Conejos County Road 13.

History
Guadalupe was among the first settlements in the San Luis Valley. It was founded by Lafayette Head in 1854.

Guadalupe served as the Conejos County county seat from 1861 — when the county was established — until 1863, when the county seat was moved to nearby and slightly higher Conejos, due to flooding from the Conejos River in Guadalupe.

References

Unincorporated communities in Conejos County, Colorado
Unincorporated communities in Colorado
Former county seats in Colorado